Ruth E. Carter (born April 10, 1960) is an American costume designer for film and television. During her film career, Carter has been nominated four times for the Academy Award for Best Costume Design, for her work on Spike Lee's biographical film Malcolm X (1992), Steven Spielberg's historical drama film Amistad (1997), and Ryan Coogler's Marvel superhero films Black Panther (2018) and Black Panther: Wakanda Forever (2022).

Carter has been nominated for the Academy Award for Best Costume Design four times, and won for her work on Black Panther and Black Panther: Wakanda Forever. She is the first Black woman to win in the category and the first Black woman to win multiple Academy Awards in any category.

Early life 
Carter was born on April 10, 1960 in Springfield, Massachusetts in a single-parent household. Her mother is Mabel Carter, and she was the youngest of eight children. At nine years old, she began attending the Boys & Girls Club. Using her mother's sewing machine, Carter learned from the organization how to read and design simplicity patterns. She graduated from Springfield Technical High School. In 1982, Carter graduated from Hampton Institute, later renamed Hampton University, with a Bachelor of Arts degree in Theatre Arts.

Career 
After graduating, Carter returned to her hometown, working as an intern for City Stage's costume department and then the Santa Fe Opera. In 1986, she moved to Los Angeles to work at the city's Theater Center. While working there, Carter met director Spike Lee, who hired her for his second film, School Daze (1988). She continued working on his subsequent films, including Do the Right Thing (1989), Mo' Better Blues (1990), Jungle Fever (1991), and Malcolm X (1992). 

Aside from her work with Spike Lee, Carter also designed costumes for Steven Spielberg's Amistad (1997) and several of John Singleton's films, such as Rosewood (1997) and Baby Boy (2001). She further designed costumes for the American television drama series Being Mary Jane on BET Networks, created by Mara Brock Akil and starring Gabrielle Union.

Carter worked on the superhero film Black Panther (2018), directed by Ryan Coogler. Deriving from Afrofuturism, her costumes were inspired by many traditional African garments, including those of the Maasai and Ndebele people. She traveled to southern Africa to draw aesthetic inspirations and received permission to incorporate traditional Lesotho designs into the film's costumes. At the 91st Academy Awards, she won the Academy Award for Best Costume Design, making her the first Black woman to win the Academy Award in the category.

In 2021, Carter received a star on the Hollywood Walk of Fame in the film category.

In 2023, Carter won her second Academy Award for Best Costume Design for Black Panther: Wakanda Forever (2022). During her acceptance speech, Carter dedicated her win to her mother, who had passed away during the prior week at the age of 101. Also in 2023, the North Carolina Museum of Art hosted an exhibit displaying more than sixty of Carter's original garments.

Filmography

Television 
Being Mary Jane (2013–2019)
Roots (2016)

Awards and nominations 

 2002: American Black Film Festival, Career Achievement Award
 2015: Essence, 2015 Black Women in Hollywood Award at the 8th Annual Black Women in Hollywood Luncheon
2019: Costume Designers Guild, Career Achievement Award
2019: Suffolk University, Honorary Degree - Doctor of Humane Letters
2020: SDFCS Awards, Best Costume Design, Dolemite Is My Name
2020: Satellite Awards, Best Costume Design, Dolemite Is My Name

References

Further reading

External links
 

1960 births
Living people
African-American designers
American costume designers
Artists from Springfield, Massachusetts
Best Costume Design Academy Award winners
Hampton University alumni
Women costume designers
21st-century African-American people
20th-century African-American people